Vladimír Bilčík (born 27 May 1975 in Bratislava) is a Slovak university lecturer and politician of Demokrati (Democrats). He has been serving as a Member of the European Parliament since 2019.

For the European Parliament elections in 2019, Bilčík ran as a leader of TOGETHER - Civic Democracy political party in a back-then Coalition of Progressive Slovakia & TOGETHER - Civic Democracy. He got 26,202 preferential votes in total.

Education 
 Armand Hammer United World College of the American West, Montezuma, USA. International High School graduated with the International Baccalaureate (1991-1993)
 Swarthmore College, Swarthmore, US. Bachelor of Arts (BA) in Economics and Political Science with focus on Public Politics and International Relations (1993-1999)
 St Antony's College, Oxford, Oxford, UK. Master of Philosophy (MPhil) in European Politics (1997-1999)
 Comenius University, Bratislava, SR. Doctor of Philosophy (DPhil) in Political Theory (2007)

Early career 
Prior entering the European Parliament, Bilčík worked as a university lecturer at the Department of Political Science, Faculty of Philosophy of Comenius University in Bratislava. Furthermore, he worked as the Head of the Research Program European Union in the Slovak Foreign Policy Association (SFPA) for almost 20 years. Bilčík was regularly publishing about the issues concerning reformation and external relations of the European Union. He was providing expert comments on European politics and the progress and consequences of Brexit in the Slovak Republic and abroad.

Member of the European Parliament, 2019–present 

In the European Parliament, Bilčík is a member of the Group of the European People's Party (EPP), the parliament's biggest group.

Bilčík has been a member of the Committee on Constitutional Affairs (AFCO), where he serves as his parliamentary group's coordinator; the Committee on Civil Liberties, Justice and Home Affairs (LIBE), within which he engages in the protection of the rule of law, the fight against misinformation, and the hybrid threats; and the Committee on Foreign Affairs (AFET), where he serves as the Parliament's rapporteur for relations with Serbia. He is part of the Democracy, Rule of Law & Fundamental Rights Monitoring Group. In 2020, he also joined the Special Committee on Foreign Interference in all Democratic Processes in the European Union, where he is now working as a rapporteur on a report that will strengthen transparency and integrity of the European Parliament. He is also part of the Committee of Inquiry to investigate the use of Pegasus and equivalent surveillance spyware, where he serves as the shadow rapporteur for the final report investigating the misuse of spyware within the European Union. Since 2021, he has been part of the Parliament's delegation to the Conference on the Future of Europe.

In addition to his committee assignments, Bilčík chairs the Parliament's delegation to the EU-Montenegro Stabilisation and the Association Parliamentary Committee.

In 2021, Bilčík negotiated a parliamentary resolution calling for the murderers of Maltese journalist Daphne Caruana Galizia to be brought to justice.

As the EPP shadow rapporteur he will be working on the European Media Freedom Act - an important piece of legislation which aims to protect media pluralism and independence in the EU.

Publications 
 The European Union Today: trends and relevance for the Slovak Republic / Vladimír Bilčík, Martin Bruncko - editors. - 2., supplemented edition. - Bratislava ; Bratislava: Slovak Foreign Policy Association, Institute for Public Affairs, 2003. - 198 p. - .

References

Living people
MEPs for Slovakia 2019–2024
1975 births
People educated at a United World College